On May 14, 2009, three Hand Grenades were thrown on Police officers in Dera Ismail Khan. A motorcycle rider threw a hand grenade on police emergency office. According to local Police Chief of city, Muhammad Iqbal, 5 police officers were wounded in first grenade's explosion three of whom were seriously hurt. In the next half an hour, two more grenades were lobbed on two police posts near a bus stand. Four police officers were injured in next two explosions. In all the three explosions, 9 police officers were injured. All injures were brought to a state–run hospital. Ashiq Saleem, doctor at hospital, said, "we have received eight injures, three of them are serious, all of them are police officers." No group have yet claimed responsibility for attacks.

On 28 May, 14 days after attack, another explosion took place near security checkpost in the city which killed 5 people.

References 

2009 murders in Pakistan
21st-century mass murder in Pakistan
Terrorist incidents in Dera Ismail Khan
Terrorist incidents in Pakistan in 2009
May 2009 events in Pakistan